The 2011 World Curling Championships may refer to one of the following curling championships:
2011 Ford World Men's Curling Championship
2011 Capital One World Women's Curling Championship
2011 World Junior Curling Championships
2011 World Senior Curling Championships
2011 World Wheelchair Curling Championship
2011 World Mixed Doubles Curling Championship

W